Luciano Guaycochea (born 24 April 1992) is an Argentine professional footballer who plays as a midfielder for Malaysia Super League club Perak.

Guaycochea has scored his first professional goal while playing in Turkey for Akhisar Belediyespor, against TKİ Tavşanlı Linyitspor in the 2013–14 Turkish Cup.

On 22 June 2022, Guaycochea signed a contract with Malaysia Premier League club Perak.

References

External links

1992 births
Living people
Argentine footballers
Süper Lig players
Expatriate footballers in Turkey
Argentine expatriate sportspeople in Turkey
TFF First League players
TKİ Tavşanlı Linyitspor footballers
Association football midfielders
Argentine expatriate footballers
Expatriate footballers in Venezuela
Expatriate footballers in Colombia
Akhisarspor footballers
Zulia F.C. players
Cúcuta Deportivo footballers
Venezuelan Primera División players
Categoría Primera A players
Categoría Primera B players
Primera Nacional players
People from Santa Rosa, La Pampa
Perak F.C. players